Kalateh-ye Cheshmeh Alimva (also Romanized as Kalāteh-ye Cheshmeh ‘Alīmva; also known as Kalāteh-ye Cheshmeh ‘Alīvān) is a village in Darzab Rural District, in the Central District of Mashhad County, Razavi Khorasan Province, Iran. At the 2006 census, its population was 38, in 12 families.

References 

Populated places in Mashhad County